Gerhard Paul Julius Thiele (born September 2, 1953) is a German physicist and a former ESA astronaut. He is the father of Die Astronautin candidate Insa Thiele-Eich.

Early life and education
Born in Heidenheim an der Brenz, he attended the Friedrich-Schiller-Gymnasium in Ludwigsburg. After school he volunteered for the German Navy, serving as Operations/Weapons Officer aboard fast patrol boats. In 1976 he began to study physics at the University of Munich and the University of Heidelberg. He received his doctorate in Heidelberg in 1985 in environmental science.

Career
From 1986 to 1987 he was a postdoc at Princeton University. In 1988 he was selected for the German astronaut team and began basic training at the DLR. In 1990 he was selected as a backup crew member for the German spacelab mission D-2 (STS-55). During the mission, which took part in April 1993, he worked in the Payload Operations Control Center of DLR at Oberpfaffenhofen as the alternate payload specialist.

In 1996, he was selected by the German Space Agency to receive Space Shuttle Mission Specialist training at NASA. In August 1998, he joined the European Space Agency (ESA), into which the German national team was integrated. In 2000, he completed his only spaceflight, the STS-99 Shuttle Radar Topography Mission.

During 2003 and 2004, he trained in Russia as the backup for André Kuipers on the Soyuz TMA-4 mission.

He retired from the European Astronaut Corps in October 2005.

As from 1 April 2010 he became Resident Fellow with the European Space Policy Institute in Vienna, Austria.

Gerhard Thiele has been appointed as the head of ESA's Human Spaceflight and Operations Strategic Planning and Outreach office (HSO-K) effective 1 July 2013.

References
 ESA profile page
 NASA biography
 Spacefacts biography of Gerhard Thiele

1953 births
Living people
German astronauts
Officers Crosses of the Order of Merit of the Federal Republic of Germany
Recipients of the Order of Merit of Baden-Württemberg
Space Shuttle program astronauts